Michel Glotz (1 February 1931 – 15 February 2010) was a French classical music record producer and impresario.

Life 
Glotz was a student of Marguerite Long and accomplice of Francis Poulenc with whom he had a long correspondence. Artistic director of several record companies (EMI, Deutsche Grammophon, RCA Victor, Philips, Sony), he had more than a thousand discs recorded, including a hundred operas. In this capacity, he obtained several Grammy Awards in Hollywood including Beethoven's nine symphonies by Herbert von Karajan with the Berlin Philharmonic in 1978, or the "most beautiful opera of the year" award for Bizet's Carmen in 1984. In 1966, he and his collaborator Thérèse Darras founded a concert agency called Musicaglotz. He then turned his attention to the careers of legendary artists such as Maria Callas, Herbert von Karajan, Alain Lombard, Alexis Weissenberg. Glotz received the insignia of officier des Arts et Lettres, and chevalier de la Légion d'honneur en 2007.

He died of a heart attack in 2010 at age 79.

Artists represented 
 Conductors: Serge Baudo, Sergiu Comissiona, James Conlon, Christoph Eschenbach, Patrick Fournillier, James Judd, Herbert von Karajan, Alain Lombard, Jesus Lopez Cobos, Kurt Masur, Seiji Ozawa, Georges Prêtre, Gennady Rozhdestvensky, Thomas Sanderling, Michel Tabachnik, Michael Tilson Thomas
 Pianists: Philippe Bianconi, Jean-Philippe Collard, Kun-Woo Paik, Ivo Pogorelich, Viktoria Postnikova, François Weigel, Alexis Weissenberg 
 Violinists: Pierre Amoyal, Anne-Sophie Mutter, Tedi Papavrami 
 Cellists: Natalia Gutman, Gary Hoffman, Yo-Yo Ma, Mstislav Rostropovich 
 Sopranos: Montserrat Caballé, Maria Callas, Renée Fleming, Mirella Freni, Inva Mula, Leontyne Price, Katia Ricciarelli, Anna Tomowa-Sintow, Shirley Verrett 
 Mezzo-sopranos: Agnes Baltsa, Jane Berbié, Teresa Berganza, Susan Graham, Sophie Koch, Christa Ludwig, Marie-Ange Todorovitch 
 Tenors: José Carreras, Laurence Dale, Placido Domingo, Chris Merritt, Kenneth Riegel, Michel Sénéchal 
 Baritones: Gabriel Bacquier, Jean-Luc Chaignaud, Manfred Hemm, Nicolas Rivenq, Bryn Terfel 
 Basses: Paata Burchuladze, Jean-Philippe Courtis, Ferruccio Furlanetto, Nicolai Ghiaurov, Tom Krause

Recordings  
 Franck's Symphony in D minor - Orchestre de Paris, Herbert von Karajan conductor, recorded in Paris, Salle Wagram, for EMI (077776474724), November 1969 
 Tchaikovski's Piano Concerto n°1 op.23 - Alexis Weissenberg, piano, Orchestre de Paris, Herbert von Karajan conductor, recorded in Paris, Salle Wagram, for EMI (3C06302044), February 1970 
 Brahms's Ouverture tragique op.81, Berlin Philharmonic, Herbert von Karajan conductor, recorded in the Jesus-Christus church of Berlin for EMI, September 1970    
 Bruckner's Symphony n°4 (Romantic), Berlin Philharmonic, Herbert von Karajan conductor, recorded in the Jesus-Christus church of Berlin for EMI, September 1970   
 Bruckner's Symphony n°7, Berlin Philharmonic, Herbert von Karajan conductor, recorded in the Jesus-Christus church of Berlin for EMI, September 1970    
 Mozart's Symphony n°38 KV504, Berlin Philharmonic, Herbert von Karajan conductor, recorded at the Jesus-Christus church of Berlin for EMI, September 1970    
 Mozart' Symphony n°39 KV543, Berlin Philharmonic, Herbert von Karajan conductor, recorded at the Jesus-Christus church of Berlin for EMI, September 1970    
 Mozart's Symphony n°40 KV550, Berlin Philharmonic, Herbert von Karajan conductor, recorded at the Jesus-Christus church of Berlin for EMI, September 1970    
 Mozart' Symphony n°41 KV551, Berlin Philharmonic, Herbert von Karajan conductor, recorded at the Jesus-Christus church of Berlin for EMI, September 1970    
 Ravel's Boléro - Orchestre de Paris, Herbert von Karajan conductor, recorded in Paris, Salle Wagram, for EMI (724356945920), June 1971  
 Ravel's Alborada del gracioso - Orchestre de Paris, Herbert von Karajan conductor, recorded in Paris, Salle Wagram, for EMI, June 1971 
 Ravel's La Valse - Orchestre de Paris, Herbert von Karajan conductor, recorded in Paris, Salle Wagram for EMI, June 1971 
 Joseph Haydn: Symphony n°83 - Berlin Philharmonic, Herbert von Karajan conductor, recorded at the French church of Saint-Maurice for EMI, August 1971 
 Haydn: Symphony n°101 - Berlin Philharmonic, Herbert von Karajan conductor, recorded at the French church of Saint-Maurice for EMI, August 1971  
 Ravel's Rapsodie espagnole, Le Tombeau de Couperin - Orchestre de Paris, Herbert von Karajan conductor, recorded in Paris, Salle Wagram for EMI, June 1971    
 Wolfgang Amadeus Mozart: Symphonie concertante KV 297b (Karl Steins, Herbert Stahr, Norbert Hauptmann, Manfred Braun), Berlin Philharmonic, Herbert von Karajan conductor, recorded at the French church of Saint-Maurice for EMI, August 1971    
 Mozart's Concerto pour flûte (James Galway) and harp (Fritz Helmis) KV299, Berlin Philharmonic, Herbert von Karajan conductor, recorded at the French church of Saint-Maurice for EMI, August 1971     
 Mozart's Concerto pour flûte (Andreas Blau) KV313, Berlin Philharmonic, Herbert von Karajan conductor, recorded at the French church of Saint-Maurice for EMI, August 1971   
 Mozart's Oboe Concerto (Lothar Koch) KV314, Berlin Philharmonic, Herbert von Karajan conductor, recorded at the French church of Saint-Maurice for EMI, August 1971  
 Mozart's Clarinet Concerto (Karl Leister) KV622, Berlin Philharmonic, Herbert von Karajan conductor, recorded at the French church of Saint-Maurice for EMI, August 1971  
 Mozart's Bassoon Concerto (Günther Piesk) KV191, Berlin Philharmonic, Herbert von Karajan conductor, recorded at the French church of Saint-Maurice for EMI, August 1971 
 Tchaikovski's Symphony n°4 op.36 - Berlin Philharmonic, Herbert von Karajan conductor, recorded at the Jesus-Christus Kirche of Berlin for EMI (Warner Classics B000NPCMJ4), September 1971  
 Tchaikovski's Symphony n°5 op.64 - Berlin Philharmonic, Herbert von Karajan conductor, recorded at thea Jesus-Christus Kirche of Berlin for EMI (Warner Classics B000NPCMJ4), September 1971  
 Tchaïkovski: Symphony n°6 op.74 (Pathétique) - Berlin Philharmonic, Herbert von Karajan conductor, recorded at the Jesus-Christus Kirche of Berlin for EMI (Warner Classics B000NPCMJ4), September 1971  
 Wagner's Tristan und Isolde (Jon Vickers, Helga Dernesch, Christa Ludwig, Peter Schreier, Karl Ridderbusch) - Chœur de l'Opéra allemand de Berlin, Berlin Philharmonic, Herbert von Karajan conductor, recorded at the Jesus-Christus Kirche of Berlin for EMI (5099902885827), January 1972  
 Franck's Symphonic Variations - Alexis Weissenberg, piano, Benck's Variations Symphoniques - Alexis Weissenberg, piano, Berliner Philharmonie, Herbert von Karajan conductor, recorded at the Jesus-Christus Kirche of Berlin for EMI (077776474724), September 1972 
 Rachmaninov's Piano Concerto n°2 - Alexis Weissenberg, piano, Berlin Philharmonic, Herbert von Karajan conductor, recorded at the Jesus-Christus Kirche of Berlin for EMI (B000246J5Y), September 1972  
 Strauss' Sinfonia domestica op.53 - Berlin Philharmonic, Herbert von Karajan conductor, recorded in Paris, Salle Wagram, for EMI, June 1973 
 Bach's Mass in B minor (BWV232) - Gundula Janowitz, Christa Ludwig, Peter Schreier, Robert Kerns, Karl Ridderbusch, Wiener Singverein) - Berlin Philharmonic, Herbert von Karajan conductor, recorded at the Berliner Philharmonie for Deutsche Grammophon (415622), 1974  
 Bartók's Concerto for Orchestra Sz116 - Berlin Philharmonic, Herbert von Karajan conductor, recorded at the Berliner Philharmonie for EMI, May 1974  
 Beethoven's Piano Concerto n°5 op.58 (Emperor) (Alexis Weissenberg) - Berlin Philharmonic, Herbert von Karajan conductor, recorded at the Berliner Philharmonie for EMI, May 1974  
 Hummel's Concerto pour trompette (Maurice André) - Berlin Philharmonic, Herbert von Karajan conductor, recorded at the Berliner Philharmonie for EMI (Warner Classics B006LL02GE), in May 1974 
 Leopold Mozart: Trumpet Concerto (Maurice André) - Berlin Philharmonic, Herbert von Karajan conductor, recorded at the Berliner Philharmonie for EMI (Warner Classics B006LL02GE), May 1974 
 Georg Philipp Telemann: Trumpet Concerto (Maurice André) - Berlin Philharmonic, Herbert von Karajan conductor, recorded at the Berliner Philharmonie for EMI (Warner Classics B006LL02GE), May 1974 
 Antonio Vivaldi: Trumpet Concerto (Maurice André) - Berlin Philharmonic, Herbert von Karajan conductor, recorded at the Berliner Philharmonie for EMI (Warner Classics B006LL02GE), May 1974 
 Beethoven's: Piano Concerto n°4 op.58, Alexis Weissenberg - Berlin Philharmonic, Herbert von Karajan conductor, recorded at the Berliner Philharmonie for EMI, September 1974  
 Strauss' Une vie de héros op.40 - Berlin Philharmonic, Herbert von Karajan conductor, recorded at the Berliner Philharmonie for EMI, October 1974 
 Strauss' Don Quixote op.35 - Mstislav Rostropovich, cello, Berlin Philharmonic, Herbert von Karajan conductor, recorded at the Berliner Philharmonie for EMI, September and October 1974 
 Wagner's Preludes of Tristan and Isolde, Lohengrin, Parsifal, Vaisseau fantôme, Maîtres chanteurs de Nürnberg, Tannhäuser: Berlin Philharmonic, Herbert von Karajan conductor, recorded at the Berliner Philharmonie for EMI, October 1974 
 Joseph Haydn: Symphony n°104 - Berlin Philharmonic, Herbert von Karajan conductor, recorded at the Berliner Philharmonie for EMI, January 1975  
 Schubert's Symphony n°8 (Inachevée) - Berlin Philharmonic, Herbert von Karajan conductor, recorded at the Berliner Philharmonie for EMI, January 1975 
 Mozart's Requiem (Anna Tomowa-Sintow, Agnes Baltsa, Werner Krenn, José van Dam) - Wiener Singverein, Berlin Philharmonic, Herbert von Karajan conductor, recorded at the Berliner Philharmonie for Deutsche Grammophon (4198672), September 1975  
 A Vienne au temps des Strauss: Le Beau Danube bleu op.314, Valse de l'Empereur op.437, Annen-Polka op.117, Marche de Radetzky op.229, Ouverture de la Chauve-Souris, Tritsch-Tratsch Polka op.214, Ouverture du Baron Tzigane, Mouvement perpétuel op.257 - Berlin Philharmonic, Herbert von Karajan conductor, recorded at the  Berliner Philharmonie for Deutsche Grammophon (139014), December 1975  
 Ludwig van Beethoven: Piano Concerto n°3 op.37, Alexis Weissenberg - Berlin Philharmonic, Herbert von Karajan conductor, recorded at the Berliner Philharmonie for EMI, September 1976  
 Johannes Brahms: Variations sur un thème de Haydn op.56a - Berlin Philharmonic, Herbert von Karajan conductor, recorded at the Berliner Philharmonie for EMI, September and October 1976  
 Jean Sibelius' Symphony n°4 op.63 - Berlin Philharmonic, Herbert von Karajan conductor, recorded at the Berliner Philharmonie for EMI, September and October 1976   
 Sibelius' Symphony n°5 op.82 - Berlin Philharmonic, Herbert von Karajan conductor, recorded at the Berliner Philharmonie for EMI, September and October 1976   
 Sibelius: En Saga op.9 - Berlin Philharmonic, Herbert von Karajan conductor, recorded at the Berliner Philharmonie for EMI, December 1976   
 Sibelius' Lemminkäinen Suite op.22 - Berlin Philharmonic, Herbert von Karajan conductor, recorded at the Berliner Philharmonie for EMI, December 1976  
 Sibelius' Finlandia op.26 - Berlin Philharmonic, Herbert von Karajan conductor, recorded at the Berliner Philharmonie for EMI, December 1976  
 Sibelius' Tapiola op.112 - Berlin Philharmonic, Herbert von Karajan conductor, recorded at the Berliner Philharmonie for EMI, December 1976  
 Tchaikovski's Piano Concerto n°1 op.23 - Lazar Berman, piano, Berlin Philharmonic, Herbert von Karajan conductor, recorded at the Berliner Philharmonie for Deutsche Grammophon (2530677) in 1976
 Beethoven's Symphony n°1 op.21 - Berlin Philharmonic, Herbert von Karajan conductor, recorded at the Berliner Philharmonie for Deutsche Grammophon (2563796) in 1977  
 Beethoven's Symphony n°2 op.36 - Berlin Philharmonic, Herbert von Karajan conductor, recorded at the Berliner Philharmonie for Deutsche Grammophon (2563796) in 1977  
 Beethoven's Symphony n°3 op.55 - Berlin Philharmonic, Herbert von Karajan conductor, recorded at the Berliner Philharmonie for Deutsche Grammophon (2563797) in 1977  
 Beethoven's Symphony n°4 op.60 - Berlin Philharmonic, Herbert von Karajan conductor, recorded at the Berliner Philharmonie for Deutsche Grammophon (2563799) en 1977  
 Beethoven's Symphony n°5 op.67 - Berlin Philharmonic, Herbert von Karajan conductor, recorded at the Berliner Philharmonie for Deutsche Grammophon (2563799) in 1977  
 Beethoven's Symphony n°6 op.68 - Berlin Philharmonic, Herbert von Karajan conductor, recorded at the Berliner Philharmonie for Deutsche Grammophon (2563800) in 1977
 Beethoven's Symphony n°7 op.92 - Berlin Philharmonic, Herbert von Karajan conductor, recorded at the Berliner Philharmonie for Deutsche Grammophon (2563801) in 1977 
 Beethoven: Symphony n°8 op.93 - Berlin Philharmonic, Herbert von Karajan conductor, recorded at the Berliner Philharmonie for Deutsche Grammophon (2563802) in 1977     
 Beethoven: Symphony n°9 op.125 - Anna Tomowa-Sintow, Agnes Baltsa, Peter Schreier, José van Dam, Wiener Singverein) - Berlin Philharmonic, Herbert von Karajan conductor, recorded at the Berliner Philharmonie for Deutsche Grammophon (2563802) in 1977  
 Beethoven's Piano Concerto n°1 op.15 (Alexis Weissenberg) - Berlin Philharmonic, Herbert von Karajan conductor, recorded at the Berliner Philharmonie for EMI, September 1977  
 Beethoven's Piano Concerto n°2 op.19 Alexis Weissenberg - Berlin Philharmonic, Herbert von Karajan conductor, recorded at the Berliner Philharmonie for EMI, September 1977 
 Debussy's La Mer - Berlin Philharmonic, Herbert von Karajan conductor, recorded at the Berliner Philharmonie for EMI, June 1977 
 Debussy's Prélude à l'après-midi d'un faune - Berlin Philharmonic, Herbert von Karajan conductor, recorded at the Berliner Philharmonie for EMI, June 1977 
 Bedřich Smetana: Ma Patrie - Berlin Philharmonic, Herbert von Karajan conductor, recorded at the Berliner Philharmonie for EMI, January 1977 
 Schubert's Symphony n°9 D944 - Berlin Philharmonic, Herbert von Karajan conductor, recorded at the Berliner Philharmonie for EMI, June 1977  
 Schubert: Symphony n°1 D082 - Berlin Philharmonic, Herbert von Karajan conductor, recorded at the Berliner Philharmonie for EMI, September 1977 and January 1978 
 Schubert: Symphony n°2 D125 - Berlin Philharmonic, Herbert von Karajan conductor, recorded at the Berliner Philharmonie for EMI, September 1977 and January 1978 
 Schubert: Symphony n°3 D200 - Berlin Philharmonic, Herbert von Karajan conductor, recorded at the Berliner Philharmonie for EMI, September 1977 and January 1978 
 Schubert: Symphony n°4 D417 - Berlin Philharmonic, Herbert von Karajan conductor, recorded at the Berliner Philharmonie for EMI, September 1977 and January 1978 
 Schubert: Symphony n°5 D485 - Berlin Philharmonic, Herbert von Karajan conductor, recorded at the Berliner Philharmonie for EMI, September 1977 and January 1978 
 Schubert: Symphony n°6 D589 - Berlin Philharmonic, Herbert von Karajan conductor, recorded at the Berliner Philharmonie for EMI, September 1977 and January 1978 
 Schubert's Rosamunde D797 - Berlin Philharmonic, Herbert von Karajan conductor, recorded at the Berliner Philharmonie for EMI, January 1978
 Debussy's Pelléas and Mélisande (Richard Stilwell, Frederica von Stade, José van Dam, Ruggero Raimondi, Nadine Denize)- Choeur de l'Opéra allemand de Berlin, Berlin Philharmonic, Herbert von Karajan conductor, recorded at the Berliner Philharmonie for EMI (724356705722), December 1978 
 Hector Berlioz: Marche hongroise - Berlin Philharmonic, Herbert von Karajan conductor, recorded at the Berliner Philharmonie for EMI (724356945920), January 1979   
 Bizet's L'Arlésienne - Berlin Philharmonic, Herbert von Karajan conductor, recorded at the Berliner Philharmonie for EMI (724356945920), January 1979  
 Chabrier's: España - Berlin Philharmonic, Herbert von Karajan conductor, recorded at the Berliner Philharmonie for EMI (724356945920), January 1979  
 Antonin Dvořák: Danse slave n°8 op.46 - Berlin Philharmonic, Herbert von Karajan conductor, recorded at the Berliner Philharmonie for EMI, January 1979   
 Dvořák: Symphony n°8 op.88 - Berlin Philharmonic, Herbert von Karajan conductor, recorded at the Berliner Philharmonie for EMI, January 1979   
 Dvořák's: Symphony n°9 op.95 - Berlin Philharmonic, Herbert von Karajan conductor, recorded at the Berliner Philharmonie for EMI, January 1979   
 Charles Gounod: Ballet de Faust - Berlin Philharmonic, Herbert von Karajan conductor, recorded at the Berliner Philharmonie for EMI (724356945920), January 1979  
 Jean Sibelius: Symphony n°1 op.39 - Berlin Philharmonic, Herbert von Karajan conductor, recorded at the Berliner Philharmonie for EMI, January 1981  
 Sibelius: Symphony n°2 op.43 - Berlin Philharmonic, Herbert von Karajan conductor, recorded at the Berliner Philharmonie for EMI, November 1980   
 Sibelius: Symphonies n°6 op.104 - Berlin Philharmonic, Herbert von Karajan conductor, recorded at the Berliner Philharmonie for EMI, January 1981   
 Sibelius' Karelia Suite op.11, Valse Triste op.44 - Berlin Philharmonic, Herbert von Karajan conductor, recorded at the Berliner Philharmonie for EMI (724356945920), January 1981 
 Smetana's La Moldau - Berlin Philharmonic, Herbert von Karajan conductor, recorded at the Berliner Philharmonie for EMI (724356945920), January 1979  
 Weber's Operture of Der Freischütz - Berlin Philharmonic, Herbert von Karajan conductor, recorded at the Berliner Philharmonie for EMI (724356945920), January 1981
 Mozart's Don Giovanni (Samuel Ramey, Anna Tomowa-Sintow, Agnes Baltsa, Kathleen Battle, Ferruccio Furlanetto, Alexander Malta, Paata Burchuladze) - Choeur de l'Opéra allemande de Berlin Berlin Philharmonic, Herbert von Karajan conductor, recorded at the Berliner Philharmonie for Deutsche Grammophon (419181), January 1985
 Tchaikovski's Symphony n°4 op.36 - Vienna Philharmonic, Herbert von Karajan conductor, recorded for Deutsche Grammophon (4153482), in 1985  
 Verdi's Requiem (Agnes Baltsa, José Carreras, José van Dam) - Choeur de l'Opéra de Vienne, Choeur de l'Opéra National de Sofia, Vienna Philharmonic, Herbert von Karajan conductor, recorded for Deutsche Grammophon (415092-415093), in 1985 
 Borodin's Prince Igor (Nicolai Ghiaurov, Stefka Evstatieva, Nicola Ghiuselev, Kaludi Kaludov, Alexandrina Miltcheva, Boris Martinovich) - Choeur de l'Opéra National de Bulgarie, Sofia Festival Orchestra, Emil Tchakarov conductor, recorded at the Palais des Congrès de Sofia for Sony (B0000026PJ) from 14 to 20 July 1987 
 Moussorgski's Boris Godunov (Nicolaï Ghiaurov, Dimiter Petkov, Michail Svetlev, Stefka Mineva, Mincho Popov - Choeur de l'Opéra National de Bulgarie, Sofia Festival Orchestra, Emil Tchakarov conductor, recorded at the Palais des Congrès de Sofia for Sony (B0000026ZCJ) in 1991 
 Tchaikovski's Eugene Onegin Yuri Mazurok, Anna Tomowa-Sintow, Nicolai Gedda, Nicola Ghiuselev, Rossitza Troeva-Mircheva, Margarita Lilowa - Chœur de l'Opéra National de Bulgarie, Sofia Festival Orchestra, Emil Tchakarov director, recorded at the Palais des Congrès de Sofia for Sony (455392J) in 1991  
 Verdi's Il Trovatore (Aprile Millo, Dolora Zajick, Vladimir Chernov, James Morris, Placido Domingo) - Metropolitan Opera Orchestra and Chorus, James Levine director, recorded at the Manhattan Center for Sony (B0000027UA) from 6 to 18 May 1991
 Verdi's Luisa Miller (Aprile Millo, Florence Quivar, Vladimir Chernov, Paul Plishka, Jan-Hendrik Rootering, Placido Domingo) - Metropolitan Opera Orchestra and Chorus, James Levine conductor, recorded for Sony (BO1AMWKJO2) at the Manhattan Center from 2 to 18 May 1991
 Puccini' s La Fanciulla del West (Mara Zampieri, Juan Pons, Placido Domingo) - Choir and Orchestra of the Milan Scala, Lorin Maazel conducting, recorded for Sony ((B00027LD66) from 27 January to 7 February 1991  
 Puccini's Manon Lescaut (Nina Rautio, Gino Quilico, Peter Dvorsky) - Choir and Orchestra of the Milan Scala, Lorin Maazel] conducting, recorded for Sony ((B013KPIW3S) at La Scala of Milan from 11 to 15 February 1992 
 Verdi's Don Carlos (Aprile Millo, Michael Sylvester, Ferruccio Furlanetto, Kathleen Battle, Samuel Ramey) - Metropolitan Opera Orchestra and Chorus, James Levine conducting, recorded for Sony (B0000028MN) at the Manhattan Center from 20 to 24 May 1992
 Mozart's Symphony n°33 KV319 - Vienna Philharmonic, Carlos Kleiber conducting, recorded for Memories (B0013345VI), in 1994  
 Mozart's Symphony n°36 KV425 (Linz) - Vienna Philharmonic, Carlos Kleiber conductor, recorded for Memories (B0013345VI), in 1994  
 Brahms' Symphony n°2 op.73 - Vienna Philharmonic, Carlos Kleiber conductor, Recorded for Memories (B0013345VI), in 1994  
 Strauss' Ein Heldenleben op.40 - Vienna Philharmonic, Carlos Kleiber conductor, recorded for Memories (B0013345VI), in 1994 
 Massenet's Hérodiade (Placido Domingo, Renée Fleming, Dolora Zajick, Juan Pons - San Francisco Opera Orchestra and Chorus, Valery Gergiev conductor, recorded for Sony (B0000029N2) from 5 to 15 November 1994

Bibliography 
 Révéler les dieux (series "Un homme et son métier", letter-preface from Herbert von Karajan), Éditions Robert Laffont Paris, 1981   
 La Note bleue (series "Recueil de souvenirs"), JC Lattès, 2002 
 Marjorie Tallchief (series "Danseurs de notre temps"), Éditions Robert Laffont, Paris, 1955 
 George Skibine (series "Danseurs de notre temps"), Éditions Robert Laffont, Paris, 1955 
 Serge Golovine (series "Danseurs de notre temps"), Éditions Robert Laffont, Paris, 1955

References 

1931 births
2010 deaths
French record producers
Impresarios
Officiers of the Ordre des Arts et des Lettres
Chevaliers of the Légion d'honneur